J'ouvert or Jour ouvert is a traditional festival known as "break day" or the unofficial start of Carnival, which takes place on the Monday before Ash Wednesday. The festival, with origins in Trinidad, traditionally begins at 2 a.m. and continues until mid-morning on Monday. J'Ouvert revellers cover their bodies in coloured paints, mud, pitch oil, dress as blue or red devils to dance the streets as an expression of liberation from the constraints of the past and in celebration of the ancestors who have gone before them. Other neighbouring islands (primarily in the Lesser Antilles), and in areas where Caribbean people have immigrated, celebrate J'ouvert before the official start of  Carnival Mas, where the more elaborate costumes are on display and danced through the city streets. 

J'ouvert is a gallicization of jou ouvè (jour ouvert in standard French), the French Creole term meaning "dawn" or "daybreak", as this is the time at which the celebration is typically held.

History
J'ouvert is celebrated in many countries throughout the Caribbean. It is believed to have its foundation in Trinidad & Tobago's Carnival history with roots steeped in the French Afro-Creole traditions such as Camboulay. J'ouvert is also a practice in many places outside the Caribbean as part of Carnival celebrations throughout the year, with the biggest celebrations happening in places around the world with large Caribbean ex-pat communities. Traditionally, the celebration involves calypso/soca bands and their followers dancing through the streets. The festival starts well before dawn and typically peaks by mid-morning.

Carnival was introduced to Trinidad by French colonials in 1783, a time of slavery. Banned from the masquerade balls of the French, the enslaved people would stage their own mini-carnivals in their backyards — using their own rituals and folklore, but also imitating and sometimes mocking their masters' behavior at the masquerade balls.

The origins of street parties associated with J'ouvert coincide with the emancipation from slavery in 1838. Emancipation provided Africans with the opportunity not only to participate in Carnival, but to embrace it as an expression of their new-found freedom. Some theorize that some J'ouvert traditions are carried forward in remembrance of civil disturbances, known as the Camboulay Riots, in Port of Spain, Trinidad, when the people smeared themselves with oil or paint to avoid being recognized.

The traditions of J'ouvert vary widely throughout the Caribbean. In Trinidad and Tobago and Grenada, a part of the tradition involves smearing paint, mud or oil on the bodies of participants. "Jab Jabs" revellers are mostly recognized for covering their bodies in oil from head to toe.

In other countries, J'ouvert is celebrated on the first day of August (Emancipation Day), and yet for other West Indian countries J'ouvert is observed the night before the daytime "Pretty Mas". Pretty Mas, a bright and festive version of the celebration, features colorful costumes which are often made of feathers, beads, gem stones, brightly coloured fabrics, glitter and other elaborate body adornments and is more popular while commercially publicized. J'ouvert uses the rebellious nature of powder, mud and oil, while Pretty Mas celebrates the abstract allure of glitter, colour and light. J'ouvert can further be contrasted with Pretty Mas in that J'ouvert is said to be for "the people" while Pretty Mas is intended for the establishment.

See also
Trinidad Carnival
Caribbean Carnival
Lists of festivals in North America

References

External links
 "Trinidad Carniva – The Greatest Show on Earth
 Trinidad Jouvert. TriniInXisle.

Trinidad and Tobago culture
Caribbean culture
Carnivals
Carnivals in Anguilla
Carnivals in Antigua and Barbuda
Carnivals in Aruba
Carnivals in the Bahamas
Carnivals in the British Virgin Islands
Carnivals in Dominica
Carnivals in Grenada
Carnivals in Haiti
Carnivals in Jamaica
Carnivals in Saint Kitts and Nevis
Carnivals in Saint Lucia
Carnivals in Saint Vincent and the Grenadines
Carnivals in Sint Maarten
Carnivals in Trinidad and Tobago
Carnivals in the United States Virgin Islands
Folk festivals in Dominica
Folk festivals in Grenada
Folk festivals in Antigua and Barbuda
Folk festivals in the Bahamas
Folk festivals in Haiti
Folk festivals in Jamaica
Folk festivals in Saint Kitts and Nevis
Folk festivals in Saint Lucia
Folk festivals in Saint Vincent and the Grenadines
Folk festivals in Trinidad and Tobago